Ann Run is a stream in the U.S. state of West Virginia. It is located in the town of Bridgeport. In Harrison County.

A variant name was Anne Branch. According to tradition, Ann Run derives its name from Anne Bailey, who paid a visit to the area.

See also
List of rivers of West Virginia

References

Rivers of Harrison County, West Virginia
Rivers of West Virginia